Pannal railway station serves the villages of Pannal and Spacey Houses in the southern suburbs of Harrogate, North Yorkshire, England, equidistant from both. It also serves the village of Burn Bridge, on the opposite side of Pannal.

It is a busy station considering the size of the village it serves. This is due to the large number of commuters using the station, from surrounding villages, for journeying into Leeds every weekday before 09:00.

History
It was built by the Contractors, James Bray, who had been appointed by the Leeds & Thirsk Railway on 26 April 1846 to build the Pannal section between Weeton and Starbeck. This was opened on 13 September 1848, when the section of line between Weeton and Ripon via Starbeck commenced operation from Starbeck only as a single line until at least February 1849 (the other line was used to convey Contractors materials for building the line south of Weeton), and services throughout to Leeds commenced on 9 July 1849.
The Leeds & Thirsk Railway changed its name to the Leeds Northern Railway in August 1851. On 31 July 1854 the Leeds Northern Railway amalgamated with the York, Newcastle & Berwick Railway and the York & North Midland Railway becoming the North Eastern Railway.

Trains began running directly to Harrogate on 1 August 1862 when the North Eastern Railway completed a short line (Pannal Loop) from Pannal Junction to Crimple Junction via a very tight curve to take trains over the Crimple Valley Viaduct and into the new central Harrogate Station, built to replace Harrogate Brunswick station. When built Pannal Junction had its own separate signalbox.

On 1 January 1923, the railways were Grouped and it became the London & North Eastern Railway.  The signalbox at Pannal Junction was closed in 1927 and the points and signals at this location were operated from the signalbox at Pannal station.

On 1 January 1948, under the Transport Act, the railways were Nationalised becoming British Railways.
The original line between Pannal Junction and Starbeck was closed on 7 October 1951 leaving the later Pannal Loop as the only line north of Pannal.

Goods traffic was withdrawn from Pannal in 1954 but the sidings remained until the closure of the signalbox and removal of the signals in 1969, when they were all lifted. The station was staffed until 15 June 1969 when it became an unstaffed halt with no facilities other than basic small shelters provided for passengers. Tickets have to be obtained from the Guard/Conductor on the train. In 2011 an automated ticket machine accepting only debit and credit cards was installed in the waiting shelter on the Up (Leeds) platform in an attempt to alleviate the problems the Conductor/Guard has collecting all the fares in peak periods. The ticket machine is still in use here, as of January 2022

In 1983, British Rail was sectorised and the services operated by British Rail Provincial later becoming British Rail Regional Railways until privatisation in 1997. Since privatisation the services have been operated by private companies as a train operating company under fixed term franchises with Arriva Trains Northern from 1997 to 2004 and Northern from 2004 and now, with three extensions, until 31 March 2016 (the term has been extended three times, two years, six months and two years respectively) the latter extension being due to the rail franchising process being found to be legally fundamentally flawed.

During 2012 Network Rail commenced resignalling the line between Armley Junction and Harrogate leading up to the signalling being commissioned and all coming under the control of the Harrogate signalbox during the period of 27–29 October 2012. A trench was dug along the Up platform for a cabling duct and access manholes to be installed to carry the signalling cables. Shorter block sections to allow for greater line capacity were installed and, for the first time since the rationalisation of 1969 ironically with longer block sections, signals can once again be seen from the station.

Former layout
The station buildings were located on the down platform (to Harrogate) and there was a timber waiting shelter, with a store, on the up platform (to Leeds). There was a signal box of standard North Eastern Railway design located at the south end of the down platform. The station had a cattle dock siding, adjacent to the up line, at the south end of the up platform, opposite the signalbox, with a ramp up to the road from this siding.

The cattle, often from Ireland, used to be driven up the ramp onto the road and the very short distance up Station Road to the former Auction Mart that was located in Spacey Houses on the opposite corner of the junction of Princess Royal Way (A61) and Follifoot Road. The goods yard had three lines of sidings accessed from a headshunt on the side of the down line. This included a coal depot on two of the sidings furthest away from the station and a small warehouse on the other siding nearest the station buildings.

Current layout
There are just the two platforms, the up line (platform 1) to Leeds and the down line (platform 2) to Harrogate with bus type waiting shelters.  Digital information screens are in place on each platform and an automated public address system is also installed to offer train running information.  Both platforms have access ramps from the main road for use by disabled passengers.

The former station buildings have been extensively extended and were converted into a public house in the early 1980s. It was first named Platform One (despite this being located on what is actually now platform 2) but, after another extensive renovation, was renamed The Harwood. In 2014, it was again converted, this time into a Co-operative shop.

When first converted as Platform One a Pullman kitchen second class parlour carriage built in 1960 as number 332, formally on the North Yorkshire Moors Railway, was incorporated into the public house as a dining room. This carriage was renamed "Mae" (after the mother of the first Landlord, Paul Eckart) but was removed and scrapped by Booths of Rotherham when the public house underwent the second renovation due to it containing extensive blue asbestos insulation.

The former goods yard on the down side is now the extensive station car park also doubling as the car park for the shop. The ramp from the former cattle dock on the up side can still be seen as a strip of inclined unused land between the station and the former Dunlopillo factory (closed in 2008). This ramp was cleared of undergrowth in 2009 in order to allow vehicular access for track maintenance and again in 2012 to allow access for the resignalling scheme.

The up track (to Leeds) is currently laid with continuously welding track on concrete sleepers and the down track (to Harrogate) is currently laid with continuously welded rails with steel sleepers.

Services

During Monday to Saturday daytimes, there is generally a half-hourly service southbound to Leeds and a half-hourly service northbound to Harrogate and Knaresborough with one train per hour onwards to York. In the evenings and on Sundays there is generally an hourly service in each direction.

Birdwatching at the station
The summer image at top right of the page shows the station before the big trees at the Dunlopillo factory (on the left in that image) were pruned back to the trunks. At that time, in early mornings in spring, you could watch buzzards trying to rob the rooks' nests. Since the trees were pruned (on the left in the snowy image) the buzzards have stopped coming, but in spring you can still watch jackdaws attempting to nest in the chimneys of the old station house (now the Co-op). The once rare and threatened red kites can now regularly be seen riding on the thermals above the station. During summer, house martins were to be seen before the industrial estate was demolished, and swifts used to scream over the station. Goldfinches and bullfinches used to graze on the weed-seeds between the station and Dunlopillo car-park, but are no longer to be seen due to mowing of this area. Blackbirds are regularly heard in the few remaining trees.

References

External links

Railway stations in North Yorkshire
DfT Category F1 stations
Former North Eastern Railway (UK) stations
Railway stations in Great Britain opened in 1848
Northern franchise railway stations